John Wright is an American curler.

Teams

Notes

References

External links
 

American male curlers
American curling champions
Living people

Year of birth missing (living people)